6th SLGFCA Awards
December 21, 2009

Best Film: 
Up in the Air

Best Director: 
Kathryn Bigelow
The Hurt Locker
The 6th St. Louis Gateway Film Critics Association Awards were announced on 15 December and awarded on December 21, 2009.

Winners and nominees

Best Actor
George Clooney – Up in the Air
Jeff Bridges – Crazy Heart
Ben Foster – The Messenger
Morgan Freeman – Invictus
Patton Oswalt – Big Fan
Jeremy Renner – The Hurt Locker

Best Actress
Carey Mulligan – An Education
Saoirse Ronan – The Lovely Bones
Maya Rudolph – Away We Go
Gabourey Sidibe – Precious
Meryl Streep – Julie and Julia

Best Animated Film
Up
Coraline
The Fantastic Mr. Fox
Ponyo
The Princess and the Frog

Best Cinematography
Nine – Dion Beebe
The Hurt Locker – Barry Ackroyd
Inglourious Basterds – Robert Richardson
Red Cliff (Chi bi) – Lü Yue and Zhang Li
A Single Man – Eduard Grau
Where the Wild Things Are – Lance Acord

Best Director
Kathryn Bigelow – The Hurt Locker
Wes Anderson – The Fantastic Mr. Fox
Oren Moverman – The Messenger
Jason Reitman – Up in the Air
Quentin Tarantino – Inglourious Basterds

Best Documentary Film
Capitalism: A Love Story
Anvil! The Story of Anvil
Food, Inc.
Good Hair
Tyson

Best Film
Up in the Air
(500) Days of Summer
An Education
The Hurt Locker
Invictus
Precious
Up

Best Comedy
The Hangover
(500) Days of Summer
Away We Go
Pirate Radio
Zombieland

Best Foreign Language Film
Red Cliff (Chi bi) • China
The Baader Meinhof Complex (Der Baader Meinhof Komplex) • Germany
Coco Before Chanel (Coco avant Chanel) • France
The Maid (La nana) • Chile
Treeless Mountain • South Korea
Without Name (Sin nombre) • Spain

Best Music
Nine
Crazy Heart
Pirate Radio
The Princess and the Frog
Up

Best Screenplay
(500) Days of Summer – Scott Neustadter and Michael H. Weber
An Education – Nick Hornby
The Hurt Locker – Mark Boal
Inglourious Basterds – Quentin Tarantino
Up in the Air – Jason Reitman and Sheldon Turner

Best Supporting Actor
Christoph Waltz – Inglourious Basterds
Robert Duvall – The Road
Woody Harrelson – The Messenger
Alfred Molina – An Education
Stanley Tucci – The Lovely Bones

Best Supporting Actress
Mo'Nique – Precious
Marion Cotillard – Nine
Vera Farmiga – Up in the Air
Anna Kendrick – Up in the Air
Mélanie Laurent – Inglourious Basterds
Samantha Morton – The Messenger

Best Visual Effects
Avatar
District 9
The Lovely Bones
Star Trek
Where the Wild Things Are

Most Original, Innovative or Creative Film
Avatar
(500) Days of Summer
District 9
The Fantastic Mr. Fox
The Lovely Bones

Favorite Scene
Up – "Opening marriage montage"
(500) Days of Summer – "'Expectations vs. reality' split-screen sequence"
(500) Days of Summer – "'Morning after' dance number"
Inglourious Basterds – "The opening farmhouse scene"
Precious – "Mo'Nique's scene at social worker office"

2009
2009 film awards
2009 in Missouri
St Louis